The Poland national under-16 and under-17 basketball team is a national basketball team of Poland, administered by the Polish Basketball Federation.
It represents the country in international under-16 and under-17 (under age 16 and under age 17) basketball competitions.

Led by tournament MVP Jeremy Sochan, Poland won the title at the 2019 FIBA U16 European Championship Division B in Montenegro. and moved back up to Division A starting in the upcoming year.

World Cup record

See also
Poland national basketball team
Poland national under-19 basketball team
Poland women's national under-17 basketball team

References

External links

Archived records of Poland team participations

National youth sports teams of Poland
Men's national under-17 basketball teams